River Valley Constituency was a constituency in Singapore. It used to exist from 1959 to 1988. The 1959 election in River Valley remains the record for the closest winning margin in any election in Singapore history.

Member of Parliament

Elections

Elections in the 1950s

Elections in the 1960s

References 

Singaporean electoral divisions
River Valley, Singapore